Joe Esposito may refer to:

Joe Esposito (author) (1938–2016), American author and publisher
Joe Esposito (singer) (born 1948), member of the Brooklyn Dreams
Joe Esposito (politician) (1872–1928), American corrupt politician
Joe Esposito (basketball) (born 1966), University of Minnesota basketball coach
Joseph Esposito (born 1950), American retired law enforcement officer